Shakuntala is an Indian television series that premiered on 2 February 2009 and aired until 6 July 2009. The show was based on characters in Hinduism where Shakuntala (Sanskrit: शकुन्तला, Śakuntalā) is the wife of Dushyanta and the mother of Emperor Bharata.  Her story is told in the Mahabharata and dramatized by Kalidasa in his play Abhijñānaśākuntala (The Sign of Shakuntala).

Plot 
The story is a fairy tale about a baby who was found by the Sage Kanva who gives her refuge in his ashram and raises her like his own daughter. Shakuntala meets King Dushyanta who is completely smitten. He approaches her, wins her heart, and gives her his Royal seal, his Ring. Circumstances separate Shakuntala from King Dushyant, and she pines for her love to return.

Cast 
 Neha Mehta as Shakuntala
 Gautam Sharma as Rajkumar Dushyant
 Javed Khan as Maharaja Puru 
 Aaina Mehta as Young Shakuntala
 Abhileen as Young Dushyant
Shreya Laheri as Young Karuna
 Sunny Nijar as Karan
 Gagan Malik as Senapati Veer
 Madhura Naik / Payel Sarkar as Rajkumari Gauri
 Shabana Mulani as Rajkumari Kalki
 Vicky Batra as Rajkumar Mritunjaya
Rohit Singh Rana as Rajkumar Arnav
 Salina Prakash as Rundi
 Nandani as Ragini (Gauri's Friend)
 Simran Khanna as Priyamvada
 Sonali K. as Anusuya
 Deepali Pansare As Gauri's Friend
 Digangana Suryavanshi as  Young Rajkumari Gauri
 Vaishali Thakkar  as Maharani Gandhari
Jalina Thakur as Jeti maa Bai
 Payel Sarkar as Rajkumri Gauri
Aaina Mehta as Young Shakuntala
Digangana Suryavanshi as Young Gauri

References 

Star One (Indian TV channel) original programming
Indian television series
Indian television soap operas
2009 Indian television series debuts
2009 Indian television series endings
Works based on Shakuntala (play)